A mokorotlo is a type of straw hat widely used for traditional Sotho clothing, and is the national symbol of Lesotho. An image of the Mokorotlo appears on the Lesotho flag, and on Lesotho license plates. The design is believed to have been inspired by the conical mountain Mount Qiloane. It is known as “molianyeoe”, which means "he who executes judgement in court" in Sesotho. It is manufactured from an indigenous grass  known as “mosea” or “leholi”.

History

The origins of mokorotlo are unclear. A similarly shaped hat, called a toedang, was commonly worn by the Cape Malays, who are descendants of slaves from the East Indies. It is believed that the Sotho may have adopted the mokorotlo through exposure to these hats.

The mokorotlo was likely adopted in the early 20th century, when chiefs began to wear the hat and began singing a song also known as the ‘Mokorotlo’ to garner support at village “Pitso”, which is a gathering. In its original form, it was exclusively worn by males to gatherings. However, in the 1950s, new designs were developed to cater to women.

Symbolism

The Sotho display the mokorotlo in their homes, indicating that they uphold the customs and acknowledge their bonds with their Balimo.

It also serves to protect the home against danger and other evil influences. The hat is an important part of Sotho cultural attire that is worn to reflect national identity and pride.

Alternative uses

Other warfare rituals, songs and poems go by the generic name of mokorotlo. It is also noted that mokorotlo refers to the traditional male dance performed by male initiates and elders.

References

Hats
National symbols of Lesotho
Sotho culture
South African fashion